Alfred Haemerlinck (27 September 1905 – 10 July 1993) was a Belgian professional road bicycle racer, who won many small races in his career (493 according to some newspapers). He won two stages in the 1931 Tour de France, and wore the yellow jersey for one day.

Major results

1927
GP 1 May of Hoboken
Balgerhoeke
Maldegem
Blankenberge
1928
Balgerhoeke
Jabbeke
Waarschoot
Vichte
1929
GP Wolber
Schaal Sels
Omloop van de Dender
Wondelgem
Braaschaat
Heusden
Meire
Maldegem
Balgerhoeke
Harelbeke
Jabbeke
1930
Antwerp-Namur-Antwerp
Brussels-Ostend
Kampioenschap van Vlaanderen
GP van Wanze
Landegem
Temse
Eeklo
Nederbrakel
Harelbeke
1931
Circuit de Paris
GP St Michel
Overmere
Brasschaat
Critérium de Genève
Deinze
Ypres
Eeklo
Jabbeke
Vichte
Tour de France:
Winner stages 1 and 6
two stages Tour of Belgium
1932
Omloop van de Vlaamse Gewesten
GP van de Groene Zegel, Lier
GP van het Noorden, Ertvelde
Oedelem
Zelzate
Deinze
Evergem
Ghent
Gistel
Bazel Waas
Temse
Kruibeke
Stekene
Zwijnaarde
Vichte
1933
Montlhéry
GP van het Noorden, Ertvelde
Hemiksem
St Kruis
Lochristi
Geraardsbergen
Hasselt
Vichte
Limburgse Dageraad
Zwijndrecht
Mere
Leuven
Petegem
Jabbeke
1934
St Niklaas Waas
Vilvoorde
Criterium van Aalst
Mere
Geraardsbergen
Hamme
Vichte
1935
Vichte
Six days of Brussels (with De Bruycker)

References 

1905 births
1993 deaths
Belgian male cyclists
Belgian Tour de France stage winners
People from Assenede
Cyclists from East Flanders